The Compass Players (or Compass Theater) was an improvisational theatre revue active from 1955 to 1958 in Chicago and St. Louis. Founded by David Shepherd and Paul Sills, it is considered to be the first improvisational theater in the United States.

History

Shepherd and Sills
The Compass Players, founded by David Shepherd and Paul Sills, was the first Improvisational Theatre in America.  It began July 8, 1955 as a storefront theater at 1152 E. 55th near the University of Chicago campus. They presented improvised plays.

Shepherd, in Mark Siska's documentary Compass Cabaret ’55, about the birth of modern improvisation, stated his reasons for founding the Compass Players, “Theater in New York was very effete and based on three-act plays and based on verbiage and there was not much action,” he said. “I wanted to create a theater that would drag people off the street and seat them not in rows but at tables and give them something to drink, which was unheard of in [American] theater.” 

Previously, Shepherd and Sills founded Playwrights Theatre Club, along with Eugene Troobnick, and employed improvisational theater forms, named Theater Games, originally created and developed by Sills' mother, Viola Spolin. These same games were employed to develop material for the Compass Players.

Evolution of Improvisation

Initially, scenes were presented only once, but some of the players grew interested in polishing material into finished pieces. For example, Mike Nichols and Elaine May created many of their signature scenes in this manner. Shelley Berman also found that he could create solo routines by showing one half of telephone conversations.

Crystal Palace
The Compass Players also opened its doors at the Crystal Palace in St. Louis, where Theodore J. Flicker, Nichols and May, along with Del Close, codified a further set of principles to guide improvisational players.

Legacy
Sills would co-found The Second City and Shepherd would return to New York City to create and produce a variety of improv forms including his Improvisation Olympics (ImprovOlympic). 

Nichols and May went on to New York, performing material largely derived from their Compass days. Close was featured in Flickers' Broadway musical comedy The Nervous Set, and afterwards developed his long-form improvisation the Harold.

Notable alumni

Alan Alda 
Jane Alexander
Rose Arrick
Ed Asner 
Sandy Baron 
Shelley Berman 
Roger Bowen
Del Close 
Bob Coughlan
Severn Darden
Bob Dishy 
Andrew Duncan 
Theodore J. Flicker
Barbara Gordon
Mark Gordon
Valerie Harper 
Barbara Harris 
Linda Lavin 
Ron Leibman 
Elaine May
Anne Meara
Mike Nichols 
Byrne Piven
Joyce Hiller Piven
David Shepherd
Yuki Shimoda
Paul Sills
Jerry Stiller

(Please note: the following sources were used to cite and authenticate the above list of Compass Players)
Mark Siska's documentary Compass Cabaret ’55
Janet Coleman's book The Compass: The Improvisational Theatre that Revolutionized American Comedy
Jeffery Sweet's book ''Something Wonderful Right Away: An Oral History of the Second City and The Compass Players'

See also
 Improvisational theatre
 List of improvisational theatre companies

References

Further reading

1955 establishments in Illinois
The Second City
American comedy troupes
Sketch comedy troupes
Theatre companies in Chicago
History of Chicago
Improvisational troupes
Performing groups established in 1955
Organizations disestablished in 1958
1950s in comedy